The University of Belgrade Faculty of Philosophy, established in 1838 within the Belgrade Higher School, is the oldest Faculty at the University of Belgrade. It is a modern social science education institution, adapting to current educational trends worldwide.The Faculty building is located at the meeting point of the Čika-Ljubina with the Knez Mihailova Street, the main pedestrian and shopping zone in Belgrade, Stari Grad.

The Faculty employs 255 teaching staff and enrolls approximately 5000 undergraduate and graduate students within ten departments: Department of Philosophy, Department of Classics, Department of History, Department of Art History, Department of Archaeology, Department of Ethnology and Anthropology, Department of Sociology, Department of Psychology, Department of Andragogy and Department of Pedagogy.

Notable alumni

 Mira Adanja-Polak, Freelance producer, journalist and presenter
 Mehdi Bardhi, Founder of the Institute of Albanology in Priština
 Alojz Benac, President of the Academy of Sciences and Arts of Bosnia and Herzegovina (1977-1981)
 Gani Bobi, Albanian philosopher and sociologist
 Milan Budimir, Serbian classical scholar
 Miloš N. Đurić, Serbian classical scholar
 Miodrag Bulatović, Montenegrin Serb novelist and playwright
 Branko Ćopić, Bosnian and Yugoslav writer
 Bora Ćosić, Serbian and Croatian writer
 Zija Dizdarević, Bosnian prose writer
 Zoran Đinđić, Prime Minister of Serbia (2001–2003)
 Rajko Đurić, Serbian Romani writer
 Jelena Genčić, Serbian tennis coach
 Trivo Inđić, Advisor to the Serbian President (2004–2012)
 Žarko Korać, Deputy Prime Minister in the Government of Serbia (2001-2004)
 Desanka Kovačević-Kojić, Serbian historian
 Sonja Licht, President of the Belgrade Fund for Political Excellence (2003–present)
 Sima Lozanić, first Rector of the University of Belgrade
 Desanka Maksimović, Serbian poet
 Miroslav Marcovich, philologist and university professor
 Simo Elaković, Serbian philosopher and economist
 Mihailo Marković, Serbian philosopher
 Dragoljub Mićunović, Serbian politician and philosopher
 Nikola Milošević,  Serbian writer and political philosopher
 Dragoslav Mitrinović, Serbian mathematician
 Vasko Popa, Serbian poet of Romanian descent
 Nebojša Radmanović, President of Bosnia and Herzegovina  (2008–2009)
 Šerbo Rastoder, Montenegrin Bosniak philosopher and historian
 Vladislav F. Ribnikar, founder of Politika, the oldest Serbian newspaper
 Veljko Rus, Slovenian philosopher and politician
 Ljubodrag Simonović, Serbian philosopher, author and retired basketball player
 Bogoljub Šijaković, Serbian Minister of Religion (2008–2012)
 Boris Tadić, President of Serbia (2004–2012)
 Ljubomir Tadić, one of the founders of the Democratic Party in Serbia
 Ljubodrag Dimić, Serbian historian and university professor
 Lepa Mladjenovic, Serbian feminist and lesbian activist
 Zdravko Dizdar, Croatian historian

References

External links

 Official website (in Serbian, English)

University of Belgrade schools
University of Belgrade
Education in Belgrade
Philosophy departments